Sean Pollock (born July 7, 1982 in Wallaceburg, Ontario Canada) is a retired lacrosse player. Pollock played 12 seasons in the National Lacrosse League, much of it with the Minnesota Swarm.

Professional career
Sean Pollock was drafted in the 2002 National Lacrosse League Entry Draft by the Columbus Landsharks (Later the Arizona Sting), 40th overall in the 4th round. Pollock didn't see any NLL action until the 2004 season where he made five appearances for the Arizona Sting recording three points. The following season Pollock was drafted by the Minnesota Swarm in the 2005 National lacrosse league expansion draft and was signed to a one-year contract with the Swarm. Pollock spent the next seven seasons with the Swarm starting almost every game with the Swarm and broke the goal, assist and points records for the Swarm which lasted until 2012. After the 2011 season Pollock was traded with two other players to the Colorado Mammoth for a third overall pick in the Boston Blazers dispersal draft. Pollock appeared in every game for the Mammoth for 3 years until his fourth season with the Mammoth began. Midway through the season Sean Pollock was cut from the team shortly after the team acquired Jeremy Noble. Soon after being released from the Mammoth the Calgary Roughnecks signed Pollock to a one-year contract. He finished the season with 42 points in 21 games including the playoffs.

Pollock retired after the 2015 season.

Statistics

References

http://www.pointstreak.com/prostats/playerpage.html?playerid=8237083&seasonid=14244 Retrieved 2015-05-26

http://www.paramountdenver.com/team/roster/sean-pollock Retrieved 2015-05-26

http://www.mnswarm.com/page/show/388928-draft-history Retrieved 2015-05-26

External links
 Official Twitter

Canadian lacrosse players
1982 births
Living people
Calgary Roughnecks players
Colorado Mammoth players
Minnesota Swarm players
Lacrosse people from Ontario